The men's 200 metre freestyle event at the 2004 Summer Olympics was contested at the Olympic Aquatic Centre of the Athens Olympic Sports Complex in Athens, Greece. The event took place on 15 and 16 August. There were 59 competitors from 53 nations, with each nation having up to two swimmers (a limit in place since 1984).

In the lead-up to the final, the event was billed as The Race of the Century or the "greatest swimming race of all-time", due to its significance and high-class field. It featured four of the fastest swimmers in Olympic history: Ian Thorpe (Australia, world record holder in the event at the time), Pieter van den Hoogenband (Netherlands, defending Olympic champion), Grant Hackett (Australia, former world record holder in the event), and Michael Phelps (United States, later became the most decorated all-time Olympian, with a total of 28 medals). The eight finalists combined for 34 Olympic and 58 World Championship titles over their careers.

Thorpe edged out Pieter van den Hoogenband in the final 50 metres to claim his second gold at the Games and fifth career medal, following his triumph in the 400 m freestyle two days earlier. With only 50 metres to go, he powered past his arch-rival to touch the wall first in an Olympic record of 1:44.71, matching the third fastest swim over the distance. Van den Hoogenband, who led the field through the first three laps under a world record pace, won silver in 1:45.23. Meanwhile, Phelps finished the race with a bronze in an American record of 1:45.32, ending his hopes of equalling Mark Spitz's 1972 record of seven gold medals. (Phelps would pass that record in 2008.)

Thorpe and van den Hoogenband were the second and third men to win multiple medals in the 200 metre freestyle. Phelps would become the fourth in 2008.

Background

This was the 12th appearance of the 200 metre freestyle event. It was first contested in 1900. It would be contested a second time, though at 220 yards, in 1904. After that, the event did not return until 1968; since then, it has been on the programme at every Summer Games.

Four of the 8 finalists from the 2000 Games returned: gold medalist Pieter van den Hoogenband of the Netherlands, silver medalist Ian Thorpe of Australia, seventh-place finisher Rick Say of Canada, and eighth-place finisher Grant Hackett of Australia. Thorpe and van den Hoogenband had finished first and second, respectively, at both the 2001 and 2003 World Championships. American Klete Keller had taken third in 2001, with Hackett earning bronze in 2003. Added to this already strong field was Michael Phelps—an individual medley specialist who had set an American record in the 200 metre freestyle as the lead leg at the 2003 World Championships (not swimming the individual event there) and beaten Keller by six-tenths of a second at the U.S. trials.

The Cayman Islands, Chile, Georgia, Latvia, Macedonia, Morocco, and Serbia and Montenegro each made their debut in the event. Australia made its 12th appearance, the only nation to have competed in all prior editions of the event.

Competition format

The competition followed the format established in 2000, with three rounds: heats, semifinals, and a final. The advancement rule followed the format introduced in 1952. A swimmer's place in the heat was not used to determine advancement; instead, the fastest times from across all heats in a round were used. The top 16 swimmers from the heats advanced to the semifinals. The top 8 semifinalists advanced to the final. Swim-offs were used as necessary to break ties.

This swimming event used freestyle swimming, which means that the method of the stroke is not regulated (unlike backstroke, breaststroke, and butterfly events). Nearly all swimmers use the front crawl or a variant of that stroke. Because an Olympic-size swimming pool is 50 metres long, this race consisted of four lengths of the pool.

Records

Prior to this competition, the existing world and Olympic records were as follows:

The following records were established during the competition:

Schedule

All times are Greece Standard Time (UTC+2)

Results

Heats

Semifinals

Final

References

External links
Official Olympic Report

M
200 metre freestyle at the Olympics
Men's events at the 2004 Summer Olympics